Beaumont-sur-Lèze (literally Beaumont on Lèze) is a commune in the Haute-Garonne department in southwestern France. According to the 2008 census it had a population of 1485, increasing to 1557 at the 2018 census.

Geography
The Lèze forms part of the commune's southwestern border, flows northeastward through the middle of the commune and crosses the village. The border between Beaumont-sur-Lèze and Montaut is formed both land and river borders. The commune is very near to the capital of the arrondissement of Muret, Muret.

The commune is bordered by eight other communes: Eaunes to the north, Lagardelle-sur-Lèze to the northeast, Muret to the northwest, Le Fauga to the west, Mauzac to the southwest, Montaut across by the river Lèze and the land border to the south, and finally by Auribail to the southeast.

Population

See also
Communes of the Haute-Garonne department

References

Communes of Haute-Garonne